Topolovo ( or ) is a dispersed settlement in the Municipality of Kozje in eastern Slovenia. It lies in the Sava Hills, west of Lesično. The area is part of the historical Styria region and is included in the Savinja Statistical Region.

References

External links
Topolovo on Geopedia

Populated places in the Municipality of Kozje